Lichess is a free and open-source Internet chess server run by a non-profit organization of the same name. Users of the site can play online chess anonymously and optionally register an account to play rated games. Lichess is ad-free and all the features are available for free, as the site is funded by donations from patrons. Features include chess puzzles, computer analysis, tournaments and chess variants.

History
Lichess was founded in 2010 by French programmer Thibault Duplessis. The software running Lichess and the design are mostly open source under the AGPL license and other free and non-free licenses. The name Lichess is a "combination of live/light/libre and chess".

On February 11, 2015, an official Lichess mobile app was released for Android devices. An app for mobile devices running iOS was released on March 4, 2015.

As of April 28, 2022, lichess.org had a global rank of 683 at Alexa, with most of its visitors coming from the United States, India, and China. According to Alexa rank, Lichess is ranked second only to Chess.com as one of the most popular internet chess servers in the world.

In April 2021, the United States Chess Federation announced its official endorsement of Lichess's fair play methodology that automatically detects obvious cheaters based on engine move matching analysis.

Tournaments and events

Titled Arenas
In December 2017 Lichess began hosting a monthly Lichess Titled Arena with cash prizes for titled players, featuring some of the best players in the world playing bullet chess. Magnus Carlsen won the first titled arena, and has regularly competed and won events since then. Later editions have featured blitz chess as well, and some events were played as Chess 960 events with randomized starting positions for each game.

As of February 2022, Carlsen has a record 17 victories in titled arenas, followed by Alireza Firouzja with 13 victories. Other participants in past editions include Fabiano Caruana, Maxime Vachier-Lagrave, Vladimir Fedoseev, Vladislav Artemiev, Alexander Grischuk, and Anish Giri.

Saint Louis Chess Club
The Saint Louis Chess Club (SLCC) regularly hosts events on Lichess with large prize funds, attracting the world's best players to compete.

In May 2020, the SLCC hosted the Clutch Chess: USA on Lichess, a four-player knock-out event with $100,000 in prizes. The participants were Fabiano Caruana, Wesley So, Leinier Domínguez, and Hikaru Nakamura. The event was won by So, beating Caruana on tiebreaks in the final (more wins in clutch games) after a final score of 9–9.

In June 2020, the SLCC hosted the Clutch Chess: International on Lichess, an eight-player invitational knock-out tournament with a prize fund of $265,000, which at the time was the largest prize fund ever offered for an online chess event. The participants were Magnus Carlsen, Maxime Vachier-Lagrave, Leinier Domínguez, Alexander Grischuk, Levon Aronian, Fabiano Caruana, Wesley So, and Jeffery Xiong. Carlsen won the event, beating Caruana 9.5–8.5 in the finals.

In September 2020, the SLCC hosted the 2020 Champions Showdown: Chess 9LX on Lichess, a Chess 960 invitational rapid tournament with a prize fund of $150,000. The participants of this event were Carlsen, Garry Kasparov, Caruana, Hikaru Nakamura, Wesley So, Levon Aronian, Vachier-Lagrave, Alireza Firouzja, Domínguez and Peter Svidler. The event was jointly won by Carlsen and Nakamura, both scoring 6/9.

Later in September 2020, the SLCC hosted the 2020 Saint Louis Rapid and Blitz on Lichess, a combined rapid and blitz event with a prize fund of $250,000. The ten invited participants included Carlsen, Nakamura and So. Carlsen and So were the joint overall winners with 24 points, with So winning the three-day rapid phase with 13 points, while Carlsen and Nakamura shared first in the two-day blitz phase with 12 points each.

Miscellaneous
In April 2020, Magnus Carlsen and Alireza Firouzja played a bullet match on Lichess, with the winner of the overall match being the first player to reach 100 wins. After 194 games Firouzja won the match 103.5–90.5 (100 wins, 7 draws, 87 losses).

In May 2020, Lichess hosted the Play for Russia charity event, to raise money for hospitals and health workers fighting the COVID-19 pandemic. The event raised 24,670,000 roubles ($335,000) and was won by Alexander Grischuk, beating Evgeny Tomashevsky in the finals. Other participants included Vladimir Kramnik, Ian Nepomniachtchi, Sergey Karjakin, and Peter Svidler.

In the same month, several chess players (including Sebastien Feller) hosted a charity event on Lichess to raise money for the Mercy hospital in Metz in the fight against COVID-19.

In August 2020, the Qatar Chess Federation hosted the Katara International Bullet Tournament on Lichess, with a prize fund of $10,000. The event was won by Magnus Carlsen, beating Daniel Naroditsky in the finals. The 2021 edition with a prize fund of $12,800 was won by Vladislav Artemiev; in the finals, he beat Andrew Tang, who had knocked out Magnus Carlsen in the semifinals.

Features

The website allows users to play games of live and correspondence chess against other players at different time controls. It has training features, including chess basics, tactics training, chess coordinates, a chess video library, an opening explorer, studies, and an analysis board. It also has a section where chess coaches can advertise their services to users.

In addition to enabling blindfold chess, the website supports the following chess variants:

 Antichess (Losing chess)
 Atomic chess
 Chess960 (Fischer Random Chess)
 Crazyhouse
 Horde (a variant of Dunsany's chess)
 King of the Hill
 Racing Kings
 Three-check chess

Lichess was the first chess-site to have features to help visually impaired people play chess on a website. It also has a chess puzzle-based CAPTCHA system.

Users can also play games against the Stockfish chess engine at a number of difficulty levels. They may also analyze specific positions from standard chess or any of the supported chess variants. The website implements a version of the Stockfish engine that runs on the user's local machine within the user's web browser for limited or infinite analysis, which will calculate best lines of play or major opponent threats. An opening book based on games played on the site or a database of two million games played by FIDE titled players is available. In the Antichess analysis board, users can utilize Mark Watkins's antichess solution database.

For registered players, Lichess employs a Glicko-2 rating system, and grants the ability to compete in tournaments, post in the forums, and request a server-side full game analysis for any finalized game. The ratings for standard chess are categorized into Ultrabullet, Bullet, Blitz, Rapid, or Classical, depending on the game's total time or estimated total time (if using Fischer time control which increments time after each move).

A Lichess mobile app is available for iOS and Android.

On March 19, 2021, Lichess announced a new feature – Puzzle Racer, a mix of Puzzle Storm, released in January of the same year, and "typeracer" (typeracer.com), citing the latter's idea "translated perfectly to solving chess puzzles". Like Puzzle Storm, a timed puzzle feature, it prompts the user to solve puzzles with increasing difficulty as quickly as possible, but with the goal to outperform opponents in both the time and accuracy sense and hence be the first to finish the race, just like typeracer. Each correct move, not puzzle, gives a user one point and fills the combo bar by one. When a bar is filled a point bonus is given as shown below.

 5 moves: +1 point
 12 moves: +2 points
 20 moves: +3 points
 30 moves: +4 points
 Then +4 points every 10 other moves.

As with puzzle storm, an official leaderboard is not yet implemented, however, players can see their daily high scores. There are no bots participating but unregistered players can also join and are given their user names randomly.

Games are stored in a database and are available to download which has served as the basis for multiple academic papers.

Gallery

See also

Glossary of chess
List of Internet chess servers
Outline of chess (subject-wide table of contents)

Notes

References

External links 

Internet chess servers
Chess websites
Free software programmed in Scala
2010 establishments in France
French social networking websites
Chess in France
French websites
Internet properties established in 2010
Advertising-free websites
Virtual communities
Free-content websites
Multilingual websites
Chess databases
2010 in chess
Non-profit organizations based in France